The Steel City Renegades are a team in the Women's Spring Football League set to begin play for 2010.  They are based in Pittsburgh, Pennsylvania. They are the sister team to the Pittsburgh Storm of the North American Football League. They play their home games at Highmark Stadium.

External links
Steel City Renegades official website

American football teams in Pittsburgh
Women's Spring Football League teams
Women's sports in Pennsylvania